is a Japanese anime series based on Arthurian legend. Produced by Toei Animation, the series consists of 30 half-hour episodes released between 9 September 1979 and 3 March 1980. The series achieved great popularity in its non-English translations.

The series tells the story of King Arthur and the Knights of the Round Table, featuring 'Arthurian' characters such as Lancelot, Guinevere, Tristan, Percival, Merlin, Uther Pendragon, and Igraine and other familiar elements of Arthurian lore, including the castle Camelot and Arthurian relics such as Excalibur. The series is not entirely faithful to the original legends since it adds new characters and stories which make the plot less brutal.

Plot
When Prince Arthur is a baby, his father, King Uther Pendragon, rules Camelot. Lavik, another king who wishes to conquer Camelot, attacks the castle. Arthur is saved by Merlin who sends him to a knight for safekeeping. For many years, this knight raises Arthur as his own son.

At the age of 15, Arthur attends a tournament with his foster father. At the tournament, he finds that he is able to pull the sword Excalibur from a stone. This action proves Arthur is the legitimate king of England. As a result, Arthur's foster father reveals the truth of his royal lineage. King Arthur and his subjects decide to fight against the evil King Lavik, who is aided by the witch Medessa.

Characters

Akira Kamiya as King Arthur
Keiko Han as Guinevere
Hideyuki Tanaka as Sir Kay
Makio Inoue as Tristan
Satomi Majima as Phine
Michie Kita as Galahad
Tesshō Genda as Lancelot
Banjō Ginga as Rubik/Lavik
Daisuke Gōri as Percival
Kenji Utsumi as Gastar
Ichirō Nagai as Sir Ector and Longinus
Hidekatsu Shibata as Yuuzel
Yasuo Hisamatsu as Merlin
Akiko Tsuboi as Igraine
Kohei Miyauchi as Archbishop
Masato Ibu as Leodegrance
Toshio Furukawa as Pellinore
Hidekatsu Shibata as Uther

Production and release

Isao Sasaki and Koorogi '73 sang the opening theme "Kibou yo sore wa" and "Ou no Naka no Ou."  The ending theme is performed by Mitsuko Horie and Koorogi '73.

In the early 1980s, a French-dubbed version, titled Le Roi Arthur, was released through Jacques Censtrier Productions. The first four episodes were released on VHS. In this version, all of the characters' names and the opening and closing theme songs were kept the same. An English dubbed version called King Arthur & the Knights of the Round Table was produced and distributed by ZIV International, Inc. in 1981.

Manga adaptation 
The series was adapted into several comics published in Telebi Magazine (テレビマガジン), Terebi Land (テレビランド) and Bōken Ō. The Bōken Ō adaptation was created by Satomi Mikuriya (御厨さと美) and "Mic Mac Production." The series was followed by King Arthur: Prince on White Horse in 1980.

List of episodes

References

External links 
 King Arthur at Toei Animation's English website
 
 

1979 anime television series debuts
1980 anime television series debuts
1979 Japanese television series debuts
1980 Japanese television series endings
Adventure anime and manga
Television series based on Arthurian legend
Toei Animation television